100 Aquarii is a star in the zodiac constellation of Aquarius. The designation is from the star catalogue of English astronomer John Flamsteed, first published in 1712. It is near the lower limit of visibility to the naked eye, appearing as a dim, yellow-white hued star with an apparent visual magnitude of 6.24. The heliocentric radial velocity is poorly constrained, but the star appears to be moving closer to the Earth at the rate of around −8 km/s.

This is an ordinary F-type main-sequence star with a stellar classification of F0 V. The star has a high rate of spin, showing a projected rotational velocity of 123 km/s. It has 1.8 times the mass of the Sun and 2.5 times the Sun's radius. The star is radiating 16 times the luminosity of the Sun from its photosphere at an effective temperature of 7,063 K.

References

F-type main-sequence stars
Aquarius (constellation)
BD-22 6141
Aquarii, 100
221357
116188
8932